Rawtenstall railway station serves the town of Rawtenstall in Lancashire, England, and is the northern terminus of the East Lancashire Railway.

It was formerly on the national railway network on the line to Bacup as well as Bury and Manchester.

The Association of Train Operating Companies have identified that the community of Rawtenstall on the East Lancashire Railway Heritage Railway could benefit from services connecting the station to the National Network.

History
The current railway station opened in 1846 as part of a line from Clifton Junction built by the East Lancashire Railway (later incorporated into the Lancashire and Yorkshire Railway). The line reached Waterfoot in 1848 and Bacup in 1852.

For most of its life the station was on a through route for passenger services between Manchester and Bacup via Bury. After being listed for closure under the Beeching Axe passenger and goods services to Bacup were withdrawn on 3 December 1966 (up to the last day services were regular at least every half an hour, every fifteen minutes at peak times and on Saturdays) and passenger services to Bury on 3 June 1972. Freight services to the British Fuel Company's coal concentration depot continued until 4 December 1980 when British Rail abruptly discontinued them, stating that the 14,000 tonnes of coal handled was far less than when the depot had been opened and the decline was mainly due to householders switching to other types of fuel. Closure came as a surprise to local councils which had been planning to transform Fernhill depot, alongside the Bury line, into a rail-served waste disposal facility capable of dealing with 600 tonnes per day by 1984. The coal depot at Rawtenstall would remain open to be served by road from rail-linked depots at Blackburn, Burnley and Chadderton.

The station was subsequently rescued and saved in 1987 by the then newly re-opened East Lancashire Railway.

The railway station today
The station has been extensively rebuilt by the East Lancashire Railway, as nothing was left of the original buildings at closure. Part of the current station building lies across the former route on towards Bacup. The station has a ticket office and waiting room in the main building. The waiting room contains replicas of an original fireplace and original seats. The waiting room recently went through a restoration project, to make the station as original as possible. The ticket office is in the centre of the station.

Along the platform there is also a small wooden waiting shelter.

There are two platform faces, however only the main one is available for regular passenger services owing to the limitations of the signalling currently provided.

The East Lancashire Railway operates every weekend throughout the year and Wednesdays, Thursdays & Fridays between Easter and the end of September.  It offers a "local residents discount card" but does not claim to offer a true public transport facility.

Services

References
Lost Railways of Lancashire by Gordon Suggitt

Heritage railway stations in the Borough of Rossendale
Former Lancashire and Yorkshire Railway stations
Railway stations in Great Britain opened in 1846
Railway stations in Great Britain closed in 1972
Railway stations in Great Britain opened in 1991
1846 establishments in England
Beeching closures in England